The Division of Scullin was an Australian Electoral Division in the state of Victoria. It was located in the inner northern suburbs of Melbourne. It included the suburbs of Carlton and Fitzroy.

The Division was named after Rt Hon James Scullin, Prime Minister of Australia in 1929–32. It was proclaimed at the redistribution of 10 August 1955, and was first contested at the 1955 Federal election. It was abolished at the redistribution of 21 November 1968.

After the 1968 redistribution and the 1969 Federal election, the Division of Darebin (which was located in Melbourne's northern suburbs) was renamed the Division of Scullin. That Division is not connected to this one, except in name.

Members

Election results

1955 establishments in Australia
Constituencies established in 1955
1969 disestablishments in Australia
Constituencies disestablished in 1969
Scullin (1955-69)